This is a chronology of the formation of "regular" or "mainstream" Masonic Grand Lodges in North America, descending from the Premier Grand Lodge of England or its rival, the Antient Grand Lodge of England.  A Grand Lodge (or "Grand Orient" as it is called in some jurisdictions elsewhere in the world) is the governing body that supervises "Craft" Freemasonry (also known as  "Blue Lodge" Freemasonry) in a particular jurisdiction or geographical area.

Freemasonry Prior to 1717
Freemasonry (or Speculative Masonry) developed out of the guilds and associations of operative stonemasons, during the late sixteenth and early seventeenth centuries.  By 1700, numerous Masonic lodges were in existence throughout England, Scotland and Ireland.  Each lodge was considered independent unto itself, and there was no supervisory body that governed all of Freemasonry.  This led to some confusion, as ritual variations developed and disputes as to the legitimacy of various lodges arose. In 1717 members of four lodges in London elected to form what they called a "Grand Lodge" to supervise the fraternity and grant charters to new lodges. Not all lodges, however, accepted the self-proclaimed authority of this Grand Lodge, and soon formed rival Grand Lodges of their own.

"Original" Grand Lodges formed by "Time Immemorial" Lodges
The following Grand Lodges were formed by pre-existing "Time Immemorial" lodges (lodges that predated the concept of having Grand Lodges to supervise and coordinate the craft, and thus were retained as having existed from "time immemorial").

  Premier Grand Lodge of England - est. June 24, 1717 - (Merged with Ancient Grand Lodge of England, or "The Ancients", to form the United Grand Lodge of England in 1813)

  Grand Lodge of Ireland - est. June 24, 1725
  Grand Lodge of Scotland - est. 1736
  Ancient Grand Lodge of England - est. 1751 - (Merged with Premier Grand Lodge of England, or "The Moderns", to form the United Grand Lodge of England in 1813)

Grand Lodges founded during the Colonial Era
Freemasonry spread from the British Isles during the Colonial Era.  All of the "original" Grand Lodges began to issue charters to individual lodges in North America, but the two English Grand Lodges (the "Ancients" and the "Moderns") were the most prolific. Starting in 1730 The Grand Lodge of England (Moderns) began to issue Warrants for Provincial Grand Lodges in the colonies.  Initially, these Warrants were issued to individuals, to act as deputies for the Grand Master in a given area for fixed periods of time, and some confusion resulted due to overlapping jurisdictions. To confuse matters further, with the formation of the Antient Grand Lodge, rival Provincial Grand Lodges were chartered under their jurisdiction.

  "Coxe" Provincial Grand Lodge of Pennsylvania, New Jersey, & New York (Moderns) - Est. 1730 - by warrant issued to Daniel Coxe by GLE for two years, allowing for a successor to be elected.  Granted jurisdiction over Pennsylvania, New Jersey, and New York.  Successors claimed jurisdiction only over Pennsylvania.  The Grand Lodge of Pennsylvania dates itself from the formation of this Provincial Grand Lodge. 
  Provincial Grand Lodge of New England (Moderns) - Est. 1733 by warrant given to Henry Price.  The Grand Lodge of Massachusetts dates itself from the formation of this Provincial Grand Lodge.
  Provincial Grand Lodge of South Carolina - Est. 1736
  Provincial Grand Lodge of North Carolina - Est. 1771
  Provincial Grand Lodge of New York (Moderns) - 1738-1780s - Warrants issued by GLE (Moderns) to Francis Goelet (1738–1753), to George Harrison (1753–1771), to Sir John Johnson (from 1771). As Johnson was a Loyalist during the American Revolution, he is believed to have taken his warrant with him when he fled to Canada, thus leaving the Moderns Lodges without a Provincial Grand Master.
  Provincial Grand Lodge for North America (Scotland) - Est. 1757 - By warrant issued to Colonel John Young.
  Provincial Grand Lodge of Canada - Est. 1759 (Became PGL of Lower Canada, i.e. Quebec, in 1792)
  Provincial Grand Lodge for Pennsylvania (Ancients) - Est. 1761 - By Warrant issued to William Ball.
  Provincial Grand Lodge of New York ("Athol Charter" - Ancients) - 1781-1784 - Although this PGL was Warranted by the "Ancients", the final Provincial Grand Master, Chancellor Robert R. Livingston (PGM: 1784-87), was actually the Master of a Lodge under the Jurisdiction of the Moderns, thus uniting the two branches of English Freemasonry in New York State.  Livingston continued in office as the first Grand Master of the independent GL of NY.
  Provincial Grand Lodge of Upper Canada - Est. 1792

Independent Grand Lodges
After the American Revolution and, again, after the incorporation of Canada, the various Provincial Grand Lodges in North America were closed, and the Lodges in each State or Province formed independent Grand Lodges.  These in turn, chartered lodges in the territories in the West and North.  As each new State or Province came into being, the lodges that had been chartered within its borders gathered together and formed new Grand Lodges.

  Grand Lodge of Virginia - Est. 1778
  Grand Lodge of New York - Est. 1782 (declared itself Independent Grand Lodge on June 6, 1787)
  Grand Lodge of Pennsylvania - Est. 1786 (Continuation of "Coxe" Prov. G.L. & Prov. G.L. of Penna.  See above.)
  Grand Lodge of Georgia - Est. December 16, 1786
  Grand Lodge of New Jersey - Est. December 18, 1786
  Grand Lodge of Maryland - Est. December 9, 1787
  Grand Lodge of North Carolina - Est. December 9, 1787
  Grand Lodge of South Carolina - Est. 1788 
  Grand Lodge of Connecticut - Est. 1789
  Grand Lodge of New Hampshire - Est. 1789
  Grand Lodge of Rhode Island - Est. 1791 
 Grand Lodge of Massachusetts - Est. 1792 (continuation of  PGL of New England (see above).
  Grand Lodge of Vermont - Est. 1794
  Grand Lodge of Kentucky - Est. 1800
  Grand Lodge of Delaware - Est. 1806
  Grand Lodge of Ohio - Est. 1808
  Grand Lodge of the District of Columbia - Est. 1811
  Grand Lodge of Louisiana - Est. 1812 
  Grand Lodge of Tennessee - Est. 1813 
  Grand Lodge of Indiana  - Est. January 13, 1818
  Grand Lodge of Mississippi  - Est. July 27, 1818
  Grand Lodge of Maine - Est. 1820
  Grand Lodge of Missouri - Est. April 21, 1821
  Grand Lodge of Alabama - Est. June 11, 1821 
  Grand Lodge of Michigan - Est. 1826 
  Grand Lodge of Florida - Est. 1830 
  Grand Lodge of Texas - Est. 1838
  Grand Lodge Of Illinois- Est. 1840 - previous Grand Lodge in existence: 1822-1827
  Grand Lodge of Wisconsin - Est. 1843
  Grand Lodge of Iowa - Est. 1844 
  Grand Lodge of California - Est. 1850
  Grand Lodge of Oregon - Est. 1851
  Grand Lodge of Minnesota - Est. 1853
  Grand Lodge of Canada in the Province of Ontario - Est. 1855
  Grand Lodge of Kansas - Est. 1856
  Grand Lodge of Nebraska - Est. 1857
  Grand Lodge of Washington State - Est. 1858
  Grand Lodge of Colorado - Est. 1861
  Grand Lodge of Nevada - Est. January 17, 1865
  Grand Lodge of West Virginia - Est. April 12, 1865
  Grand Lodge of Montana - Est. January 24, 1866
  Grand Lodge of Nova Scotia - Est. February 20, 1866
  Grand Lodge of Idaho - Est. December 17, 1867
  Grand Lodge of British Columbia and Yukon - Est. December 24, 1867
  Grand Lodge of New Brunswick - Est. 1868 
  Grand Lodge of Quebec - Est. 1869
  Grand Lodge of Utah - Est. 1872
  Grand Lodge of the Indian Territory - Est. Oct. 6, 1874 (Reestablished in 1892 as Grand Lodge of Oklahoma)
  Grand Lodge of Wyoming - Est. December 15, 1874 
  Grand Lodge of Manitoba - Est. May 12, 1875
  Grand Lodge of Prince Edward Island - Est. June 23, 1875
  Grand Lodge of New Mexico - Est. 1877
  Grand Lodge of Arizona - Est. 1882
  Grand Lodge of North Dakota - Est. 1889
   Grand Lodge of Oklahoma - Est. 1892 (Replaced the Grand Lodge of Indian Territory)
  Grand Lodge of Alberta - Est. 1905
  Grand Lodge of Saskatchewan - Est. August 9, 1906
  Grand Lodge of Alaska Est. 1981
  Grand Lodge of Hawaii Est. 1989
  Grand Lodge of Newfoundland and Labrador - Est. 1997

History of Freemasonry in the United States

See also
 List of Masonic Grand Lodges North America
General list of masonic Grand Lodges
History of Freemasonry

References

Further reading
 Bullock, Steven C. Revolutionary brotherhood: Freemasonry and the transformation of the American social order, 1730-1840 (UNC Press Books, 2011).
 Formisano, Ronald P., and Kathleen Smith Kutolowski. "Antimasonry and Masonry: The Genesis of Protest, 1826-1827." American Quarterly 29.2 (1977): 139-165. online
 Hackett, David G. That Religion in Which All Men Agree : Freemasonry in American Culture (U of California Press, 2015) excerpt
 Hinks, Peter P. et al. All Men Free and Brethren: Essays on the History of African American Freemasonry  (Cornell UP, 2013).
 Kantrowitz, Stephen. " 'Intended for the Better Government of Man': The Political History of African American Freemasonry in the Era of Emancipation." Journal of American History 96#4, (2010), pp. 1001–26. online.
 Mackey, Albert Gallatin. The History of Freemasonry, Vol. 6 (Masonic History Co., NY, 1898) pages 1485-1486 online membership by state 1898

 Weisberger, R. William et al.  Freemasonry on Both Sides of the Atlantic: Essays concerning the Craft in the British Isles, Europe, the United States, and Mexico (2002), 969pp
 York, Neil L. “Freemasons and the American Revolution.” Historian 55#2 (1993), pp. 315–30. online

Freemasonry in Canada
Freemasonry in the United States